Ahmed Yasser (born 27 November 1991) is an Egyptian football striker currently playing for National Bank of Egypt SC.

Yasser started his professional career with Wadi Degla, moving on loan for half a season to Belgian Third Division team Turnhout in 2013. Following that season he moved on a permanent basis to Lierse, playing in the Belgian Pro League, but was loaned back to Wadi Degla in the beginning of 2014. He signed for Al-Minaa on a 6-month loan deal on January 29, 2017.

References

1991 births
Living people
Egyptian footballers
Wadi Degla SC players
KFC Turnhout players
Lierse S.K. players
Belgian Pro League players
Egyptian expatriate footballers
Expatriate footballers in Belgium
Egyptian expatriate sportspeople in Iraq
Expatriate footballers in Iraq
Al-Mina'a SC players
Association football forwards